The Xingó Dam is a concrete face rock-fill dam on the São Francisco River on the border of Alagoas and Sergipe, near Piranhas, Brazil. The dam was built for navigation, water supply and hydroelectric power generation as it supports a  power station. It was constructed between 1987 and 1994 and the last of its generators was commissioned in 1997.  In Portuguese, the dam is called the Usina Hidrelétrica de Xingó.

Construction
Studies for the Xingó Dam were done in the 1950s and contracts for construction were not awarded until 1982. Construction on the dam began in March 1987 but stopped in September 1988 because a debt crisis stalled funding. Construction commenced again in 1990 and by 1994, the dam was complete. On June 10, 1994, the dam began to impound the river as its reservoir began to fill. The power station's first generator was commissioned in December 1994, the next two in 1995, two more in 1996 and the final generator in August 1997.

Dam
Four saddles dams (dikes) are also used to support the reservoir.
Part of the reservoir and the canyons upstream to the Paulo Afonso Hydroelectric Complex are protected by the  Rio São Francisco Natural Monument.

Power plant
It was designed by Promon and contains 6 x  Francis turbines that were manufactured by Siemens.

See also

 Energy policy of Brazil
 List of power stations in Brazil

References

Dams completed in 1994
Dams in Alagoas
Concrete-face rock-fill dams
Dams on the São Francisco River
Dams in Sergipe